The 2008–09 FIS Snowboard World Cup is a multi race tournament over a season for snowboarding. The season began on September 6, 2008, and finished on 22 March 2009. The World Cup is organized by the FIS who also runs world cups and championships in cross-country skiing, ski jumping, Nordic combined, alpine skiing, and freestyle skiing.

Fixtures / Results

Standings

Men

Overall

Parallel slalom

Snowboardcross

Halfpipe

Big Air

Women

Overall

Parallel slalom

Snowboardcross

Halfpipe

External links
FisSnowboardWorldCup.com FIS Snowboard World Cup - Official FIS Page
Official site

FIS Snowboard World Cup
Fis Snowboard World Cup
Fis Snowboard World Cup